Malechowo  (formerly ) is a village in Sławno County, West Pomeranian Voivodeship, in north-western Poland. It is the seat of the gmina (administrative district) called Gmina Malechowo.

For the history of the region, see History of Pomerania.

The village has a population of 589.

References

Villages in Sławno County